Don Parsons (born January 17, 1969) is an American former professional ice hockey player. Parsons is noted for being a prolific goal scorer who briefly held the modern minor league goal-scoring record from 2008 to 2010.

Career

Early career and college
Parson started playing hockey as a defenseman for Archbishop Williams High School in Braintree, Massachusetts because of a lack of defensemen on the teams that he played on. Although he wanted to play forward, he continued to play defense as a member of the UMass Lowell hockey team from 1988 to 1992, where he scored 18 goals in 107 games.

Professional
In Parsons's rookie ECHL season, newly hired rookie Nashville head coach Nick Fotiu asked Parsons if he wanted to make the move from playing defense to playing forward. Parsons agreed, and scored 27 goals as a member of the Knights' third line. Parson signed with the Tallahassee Tiger Sharks for the 1994-95 season and scored 41 goals. The following season, he signed with the Johnstown Chiefs, reuniting him with former coach Fotiu and he had his first fifty-goal season, accomplishing the feat with a four-goal night on the final game of the season. Parsons would leave the Chiefs that season and sign with the Baton Rouge Kingfish. He was later be traded to the Louisiana Ice Gators, where he would have his second fifty-goal season while in the ECHL.

Parsons signed with the Flint Generals of the United Hockey League. After one season with the Generals, Parsons signed with the Memphis Riverkings, where he stayed for six seasons.

On December 26, 2008 Parsons broke the modern minor hockey record for goals scored by registering his 678th goal against the Flint Generals. Parsons finished his career scoring 682 goals. His record was eclipsed by Robin Bouchard who scored his 683 career goal on March 20, 2010, against the Quad City Mallards of the IHL.

Parson was waived by the Bloomington PrairieThunder on January 6, 2009. Both management and Parsons announced that it was done for salary cap reasons.

Retirement
Parsons's #13 was retired by the Memphis Riverkings in a pregame ceremony on March 14, 2010. He is the second such honoree in the team's history, joining the late Scott Brower.

Coaching career
In mid-2011 Parsons was appointed head coach of the Lebanon Valley College team. The team finished the season 11-20 and reached the Eastern Collegiate Hockey Association playoffs for the first time.

Personal
Parsons currently lives outside of Lancaster, PA and is married to his wife Kristen, and have three children: Abby, Maggy, and Maddox. They met while Parsons was a member of the Johnstown Chiefs.

Career statistics

Awards
CHL
2000-01 Joe Burton Award (Scoring Champion)
2001-02 Most Valuable Player
2001-02 Most Valuable Player, Playoffs
2002-03 Most Valuable Player
2002-03 Joe Burton Award
2003-04 Man Of The Year
2004-05 All-CHL Team

Records
ECHL
Most consecutive 40+ goal seasons (4) - 1994-99 (Nashville, Tallahassee, Johnstown, Baton Rouge, Louisiana)

References

External links

Don Parsons at EliteProspects.com

1969 births
American men's ice hockey forwards
Baton Rouge Kingfish players
Bloomington PrairieThunder players
Cleveland Lumberjacks players
Flint Generals players
Johnstown Chiefs players
Las Vegas Coyotes players
Living people
Long Island Jawz players
Louisiana IceGators (ECHL) players
Manitoba Moose (IHL) players
Memphis RiverKings players
Nashville Knights players
New Jersey Rockin' Rollers players
Quad City Mallards (UHL) players
St. John's Maple Leafs players
Tallahassee Tiger Sharks players
UMass Lowell River Hawks men's ice hockey players
Worcester IceCats players
Ice hockey people from Boston
Archbishop Williams High School alumni